Sage Township is a civil township of Gladwin County in the U.S. state of Michigan.  The population was 2,457 at the 2010 census.

Geography

Pratt Lake is located in the center of the township.

Major highways
 runs west–east and forms most of the northern boundary of the township.  At the northeast corner of the township, M-18 turns south and forms the entire eastern boundary of the township.
 runs west–east for a brief length at the southwest corner of the township.

Demographics
As of the census of 2000, there were 2,617 people, 986 households, and 775 families residing in the township. The racial makeup of the township was 97.02% White, 0.04% African American, 0.76% Native American, 0.38% Asian, 0.27% from other races, and 1.53% from two or more races. Hispanic or Latino of any race were 0.38% of the population.

There were 986 households, out of which 31.2% had children under the age of 18 living with them, 67.8% were married couples living together, 7.9% had a female householder with no husband present, and 21.3% were non-families. 18.5% of all households were made up of individuals, and 8.5% had someone living alone who was 65 years of age or older.  The average household size was 2.60 and the average family size was 2.93.

In the township the population was spread out, with 24.7% under the age of 18, 6.2% from 18 to 24, 24.1% from 25 to 44, 26.6% from 45 to 64, and 18.4% who were 65 years of age or older.  The median age was 42 years. For every 100 females, there were 98.1 males.  For every 100 females age 18 and over, there were 95.0 males.

The median income for a household in the township was $33,173, and the median income for a family was $37,143. Males had a median income of $31,078 versus $22,339 for females. The per capita income for the township was $15,470.  About 9.3% of families and 12.2% of the population were below the poverty line, including 17.9% of those under age 18 and 4.8% of those age 65 or over.

References

Townships in Gladwin County, Michigan
Townships in Michigan